Labidodemas rugosum is a species of sea cucumber in the family Holothuriidae. It is native to the tropical Indo-Pacific region.

Description
Labidodemas rugosum has a distinctive white-pink hue. It is covered in long pinkish-white papillae.

Distribution and habitat 
Labidodemas rugosum is found off the coasts of Asia and Africa, in the tropical Indian Ocean and the western Pacific Ocean. Its range extends from the Red Sea, the east coast of Africa and Madagascar, to India and the Maldives, to Indonesia, northern Australia, the Philippines, Malaysia, New Guinea and other island groups in the western Pacific.

Status
Labidodemas rugosum is uncommon, but widespread throughout the Indo-Pacific, and not widely fished. Due to this, the International Union for Conservation of Nature has assessed the conservation status of this sea cucumber as least concern.

References

Holothuriidae
Fauna of the Indian Ocean
Fauna of the Pacific Ocean
Animals described in 1875